George Wyner (born October 20, 1945) is an American film and television actor. Wyner graduated from Syracuse University in 1968 as a drama major and was an in-demand character actor by the early 1970s. Wyner has made guest appearances in over 100 television series and co-starred in nine. His roles include Assistant District Attorney Bernstein on the series Hill Street Blues, Colonel Sandurz in the film Spaceballs, and Rabbi Nachtner in A Serious Man.

Early life
Wyner was born in Boston, Massachusetts. His father, Edward, founded and managed Boston's Ritz Carlton Hotel, which was the premier society hotel in Boston through the 1950s. Wyner's father died while his son was in high school. Wyner's family is Jewish.

Career 
Wyner was introduced to producer Steven Bochco while appearing in Bochco's short-lived 1976 series, Delvecchio. This led to the role as Irwin Bernstein in Hill Street Blues, and to roles in four subsequent Bochco productions: Doogie Howser, M.D., Brooklyn South, NYPD Blue and L.A. Law. Additionally, Wyner has appeared on the following programs for Hill Streets production company, MTM: Rhoda, The Bob Newhart Show, The White Shadow, WKRP in Cincinnati and Newhart.

Filmography 
 All the President's Men (1976) as Attorney #2
 The Bad News Bears (1976) as White Sox coach
 Dogs (1976) as Michael Fitzgerald
 The Bad News Bears Go to Japan (1978) as The Network Director
 Whose Life Is It Anyway? (1981) as Dr. Jacobs
 My Favorite Year (1982) as Myron Fein
 To Be or Not to Be (1983) as Ratkowski
 Fletch (1985) as Marvin Gillet (a.k.a. "Arnold T. Pants, Esq.")
 Wildcats (1986) as Principal Walker
 Spaceballs (1987) as Col. Sandurz
 Fletch Lives (1989) as Marvin Gillet
 The Postman (1997) as Benning Mayor
 The Devil's Advocate (1997) as Meisel
 Not Another Teen Movie (2001) as Principal Cornish
 American Pie 2 (2001) as the Camp Director
 How to Be a Serial Killer (2008) as Dr. Goldberg
 A Serious Man (2009) as Rabbi Nachtner
 Trouble with the Curve (2012) as Rosenbloom
 Armed Response (2013) as Rafferty
 Deadly Patient (2018) as Mr. Richards

Television

 The Odd Couple (1971) as Art Director
 Ironside (1972) as Tech Director / First Clerk
 Adam's Rib (1973)
 Columbo (1973) as Film Editor
 Kojak (1974-1978) as Asst. DA Linnick / Sergeant Collins
 The Missiles Of October (1974) as a civilian aide
 The Bob Newhart Show (1975) as 'Flipper', Rex Pottinger / Rex Pottinger
 Ellery Queen (1975) as Joe Kemmelman
 Sanford and Son (1975) as Percy G. Hopweather
 McMillan & Wife (1975) as Frank Daniels
 The Rockford Files (1975-1977) as Stephen Kalifer / Max Steinberg / Brice / Strock
 Hawaii Five-O (1976) as Allen Sherick
 Baa Baa Black Sheep (1976) as Ben Farber
 Charlie's Angels (1976) as La Plante
 Quincy M.E. (1976-1980) as Allan Stuart / Assistant DA Glendon / Asst. DA Richard Feldman / Asst. City Controller Harold P. Marcus
 M*A*S*H (1978) as Cpl. Benson
 Emergency! (1978) as Doctor
 Kaz (1978-1979) as D.A. Frank Revko
 All in the Family (1979) as Dr. Sidney Shapiro
 WKRP in Cincinnati (1980) as D. Arnold Gonzer
 Alice (1980) as Marty
 Soap (1981) as Dr. Rudolph
 Nero Wolfe (1981) as Saul Panzer
 Lou Grant (1981) as Jeff Benedict
 Cass Malloy (1982) as Deputy Max Rosenkrantz
 Matt Houston (1982-1985) as Murray Chase
 Fantasy Island (1984) as Dave the choreographer
 The A-Team (1984) as Richie Hauser
 Simon & Simon (1984) as Watson
 Hail to the Chief (1985) as Irving Metzman
 The Fall Guy (1986) as Henry Morris
 It's a Living (1986) as Ricardo Melon
 She's the Sheriff (1987-1989) as Deputy Max Rubin
 Murder, She Wrote (1988-1995) as Jim Kenton / Harcourt Fenton / Dr. Lewis
 The Famous Teddy Z (1989)
 Perfect Strangers (1989-1992) as Marvin Berman / Dr. Aldridge
 The Golden Girls (1990) as Dr. Norgan
 Quantum Leap (1991) as Ben Harris
 Man of the People (1991-1992) as Art Lurie
 Step by Step (1992) as Mel
 L.A. Law (1993) as Aaron Voss
 Good Advice (1993-1994) as Artie Cohen
 Married... with Children (1994) as Ronald N. Michaels
 Coach (1995) as Herb Spiegel
 Boy Meets World (1996) as Frank
 Murphy Brown (1997) as Dr. Anglund
 The Larry Sanders Show (1998) as Paul Fisher
 Walker, Texas Ranger (1998) as Dr. Jarred Buckler
 The Practice (1999) as Rabbi Stewart Lewis
 Malcolm & Eddie (1999) as Phil Easterwood
 Sabrina, the Teenage Witch (2000) as President
 Days of Our Lives (2001-2013) as Judge David Goldberg / Leon Stern / Judge Carlson
 Dharma & Greg (2002) as Herb
 Malcolm in the Middle (2002) as Foreman Fred
 Stargate SG-1 (2002) as Al Martell
 The West Wing (2003) as Congressman Simmel
 Nip/Tuck (2003) as Doctor
 Two and a Half Men (2003) as Sheldon
 Without a Trace (2004) as Hon. Francis Whitmire
 ER (2007-2008) as Rabbi
 Desperate Housewives (2007-2009) as Dr. Rushton
 Bones (2008) as Judge Marcus Haddoes
 The Mentalist (2009-2011) as Dr. Steiner
 House (2010) as Dr. Richardson
 Glee (2011) as Plastic Surgeon
 Retired at 35 (2011-2012) as Richard
 Melissa and Joey (2011-2014) as Judge Reuben Biddle
 Anger Management (2014) as Dr. Richter
 Friends with Better Lives (2014) as Dr. Gunderson
 Dr. Ken (2016) as Dicky Wexler
 The Big Bang Theory (2017) as Dr. Zane
 New Amsterdam (2018 TV series) as Rabbi Skillman - S1/E8 "Three Dots" (2018)
 Grace and Frankie (2021) as Rabbi Safchik
 Reboot (2022) as Bob

References

External links 
 
 George Wyner on tvland.com

1945 births
Living people
American male film actors
American male television actors
Male actors from Boston
20th-century American male actors
21st-century American male actors
Jewish American male actors
21st-century American Jews